The phosphorus cycle is the biogeochemical cycle that describes the movement of phosphorus through the lithosphere, hydrosphere, and biosphere. Unlike many other biogeochemical cycles, the atmosphere does not play a significant role in the movement of phosphorus, because phosphorus and phosphorus-based compounds are usually solids at the typical ranges of temperature and pressure found on Earth. The production of phosphine gas occurs in only specialized, local conditions. Therefore, the phosphorus cycle should be viewed from whole Earth system and then specifically focused on the cycle in terrestrial and aquatic systems.

Living organisms require phosphorus, a vital component of DNA, RNA, ATP, etc, for their proper functioning. Plants assimilate phosphorus as phosphate and incorporate it into organic compounds and in animals, phosphorus is a key component of bones, teeth, etc. On the land, phosphorus gradually becomes less available to plants over thousands of years, since it is slowly lost in runoff. Low concentration of phosphorus in soils reduces plant growth and slows soil microbial growth, as shown in studies of soil microbial biomass. Soil microorganisms act as both sinks and sources of available phosphorus in the biogeochemical cycle. Short-term transformation of phosphorus is chemical, biological, or microbiological. In the long-term global cycle, however, the major transfer is driven by tectonic movement over geologic time.

Humans have caused major changes to the global phosphorus cycle through shipping of phosphorus minerals, and use of phosphorus fertilizer, and also the shipping of food from farms to cities, where it is lost as effluent.

Phosphorus in the environment

Ecological function
Phosphorus is an essential nutrient for plants and animals. Phosphorus is a limiting nutrient for aquatic organisms. Phosphorus forms parts of important life-sustaining molecules that are very common in the biosphere. Phosphorus does enter the atmosphere in very small amounts when the  dust is dissolved in rainwater and seaspray but remains mostly on land and in rock and soil minerals. Eighty percent of the mined phosphorus is used to make fertilizers. Phosphates from fertilizers, sewage and detergents can cause pollution in lakes and streams. Over-enrichment of phosphate in both fresh and inshore marine waters can lead to massive algae blooms. In fresh water, the death and decay of these blooms leads to eutrophication. An example of this is the Canadian Experimental Lakes Area.

These freshwater algal blooms should not be confused with those in saltwater environments. Recent research suggests that the predominant pollutant responsible for algal blooms in saltwater estuaries and coastal marine habitats is nitrogen.

Phosphorus  occurs most abundantly in nature as part of the orthophosphate ion (PO4)3−, consisting of a P atom and 4 oxygen atoms. On land most phosphorus is found in rocks and minerals. Phosphorus-rich deposits have generally formed in the ocean or from guano, and over time, geologic processes bring ocean sediments to land. Weathering of rocks and minerals release phosphorus in a soluble form where it is taken up by plants, and it is transformed into organic compounds.  The plants may then be consumed by herbivores and the phosphorus is either incorporated into their tissues or excreted. After death, the animal or plant decays, and phosphorus is returned to the soil where a large part of the phosphorus is transformed into insoluble compounds. Runoff may carry a small part of the phosphorus back to the ocean. Generally with time (thousands of years) soils become deficient in phosphorus leading to ecosystem retrogression.

Major pools in aquatic systems
There are four major pools of phosphorus in freshwater ecosystems: inorganic phosphorus , dissolved organic phosphorus (DOP), particulate organic phosphorus (POP), and particulate inorganic phosphorus (PIP). Dissolved material is defined as substances that pass through a 0.45 μm filter. DIP consists mainly of orthophosphate (PO43-) and polyphosphate, while DOP consists of DNA and phosphoproteins. Particulate matter are the substances that get caught on a 0.45 μm filter and do not pass through. POP consists of both living and dead organisms, while PIP mainly consists of hydroxyapatite, Ca5(PO4)3OH . Inorganic phosphorus comes in the form of readily soluble orthophosphate. Particulate organic phosphorus occurs in suspension in living and dead protoplasm and is insoluble. Dissolved organic phosphorus is derived from the particulate organic phosphorus by excretion and decomposition and is soluble.

Biological function
The primary biological importance of phosphates is as a component of nucleotides, which 
serve as energy storage within cells (ATP) or when linked together, form the nucleic acids DNA and RNA. The double helix of our DNA is only possible because of the phosphate ester bridge that binds the helix. Besides making biomolecules, phosphorus is also found in bone and the enamel of mammalian teeth, whose strength is derived from calcium phosphate in the form of hydroxyapatite. It is also found in the exoskeleton of insects, and phospholipids (found in all biological membranes).  It also functions as a buffering agent in maintaining acid base homeostasis in the human body.

Phosphorus cycling

Phosphates move quickly through plants and animals; however, the processes that move them through the soil or ocean are very slow, making the phosphorus cycle overall one of the slowest biogeochemical cycles.

The global phosphorus cycle includes four major processes:
(i) tectonic uplift and exposure of phosphorus-bearing rocks such as apatite to surface weathering;
(ii) physical erosion, and chemical and biological weathering of phosphorus-bearing rocks to provide dissolved and particulate phosphorus to soils, lakes and rivers;
(iii) riverine and subsurface transportation of phosphorus to various lakes and run-off to the ocean;
(iv) sedimentation of particulate phosphorus (e.g., phosphorus associated with organic matter and oxide/carbonate minerals) and eventually burial in marine sediments (this process can also occur in lakes and rivers).

In terrestrial systems, bioavailable P (‘reactive P’) mainly comes from weathering of phosphorus-containing rocks. The most abundant primary phosphorus-mineral in the crust is apatite, which can be dissolved by natural acids generated by soil microbes and fungi, or by other chemical weathering reactions and physical erosion. The dissolved phosphorus is bioavailable to terrestrial organisms and plants and is returned to the soil after their decay. Phosphorus retention by soil minerals (e.g., adsorption onto iron and aluminum oxyhydroxides in acidic soils and precipitation onto calcite in neutral-to-calcareous soils) is usually viewed as the most important process in controlling terrestrial P-bioavailability in the mineral soil. This process can lead to the low level of dissolved phosphorus concentrations in soil solution. Various physiological strategies are used by plants and microorganisms for obtaining phosphorus from this low level of phosphorus concentration.

Soil phosphorus is usually transported to rivers and lakes and can then either be buried in lake sediments or transported to the ocean via river runoff. Atmospheric phosphorus deposition is another important marine phosphorus source to the ocean. In surface seawater, dissolved inorganic phosphorus, mainly orthophosphate (PO43-), is assimilated by phytoplankton and transformed into organic phosphorus compounds. Phytoplankton cell lysis releases cellular dissolved inorganic and organic phosphorus to the surrounding environment. Some of the organic phosphorus compounds can be hydrolyzed by enzymes synthesized by bacteria and phytoplankton and subsequently assimilated. The vast majority of phosphorus is remineralized within the water column, and approximately 1% of associated phosphorus carried to the deep sea by the falling particles is removed from the ocean reservoir by burial in sediments. A series of diagenetic processes act to enrich sediment pore water phosphorus concentrations, resulting in an appreciable benthic return flux of phosphorus to overlying bottom waters. These processes include
 (i) microbial respiration of organic matter in sediments,
 (ii) microbial reduction and dissolution of iron and manganese (oxyhydr)oxides with subsequent release of associated phosphorus, which connects the phosphorus cycle to the iron cycle, and
 (iii) abiotic reduction of iron (oxyhydr)oxides by hydrogen sulfide and liberation of iron-associated phosphorus.

Additionally,
 (iv) phosphate associated with calcium carbonate and
 (v) transformation of iron oxide-bound phosphorus to vivianite play critical roles in phosphorus burial in marine sediments.
These processes are similar to phosphorus cycling in lakes and rivers.

Although orthophosphate (PO43-), the dominant inorganic P species in nature, is oxidation state (P5+), certain microorganisms can use phosphonate and phosphite (P3+ oxidation state) as a P source by oxidizing it to orthophosphate. Recently, rapid production and release of reduced phosphorus compounds has provided new clues about the role of reduced P as a missing link in oceanic phosphorus.

Phosphatic minerals
The availability of phosphorus in an ecosystem is restricted by the rate of release of this element during weathering. The release of phosphorus from apatite dissolution is a key control on ecosystem productivity. The primary mineral with significant phosphorus content, apatite [Ca5(PO4)3OH] undergoes carbonation.

Little of this released phosphorus is taken up by biota (organic form), whereas a larger proportion reacts with other soil minerals.  This leads to precipitation into unavailable forms in the later stage of weathering and soil development. Available phosphorus is found in a biogeochemical cycle in the upper soil profile, while phosphorus found at lower depths is primarily involved in geochemical reactions with secondary minerals.  Plant growth depends on the rapid root uptake of phosphorus released from dead organic matter in the biochemical cycle. Phosphorus is limited in supply for plant growth. Phosphates move quickly through plants and animals; however, the processes that move them through the soil or ocean are very slow, making the phosphorus cycle overall one of the slowest biogeochemical cycles.

Low-molecular-weight (LMW) organic acids are found in soils. They originate from the activities of various microorganisms in soils or may be exuded from the roots of living plants. Several of those organic acids are capable of forming stable organo-metal complexes with various metal ions found in soil solutions. As a result, these processes may lead to the release of inorganic phosphorus associated with aluminum, iron, and calcium in soil minerals. The production and release of oxalic acid by mycorrhizal fungi explain their importance in maintaining and supplying phosphorus to plants.

The availability of organic phosphorus to support microbial, plant and animal growth depends on the rate of their degradation to generate free phosphate. There are various enzymes such as phosphatases, nucleases and phytase involved for the degradation. Some of the abiotic pathways in the environment studied are hydrolytic reactions and photolytic reactions. Enzymatic hydrolysis of organic phosphorus is an essential step in the biogeochemical phosphorus cycle, including the phosphorus nutrition of plants and microorganisms and the transfer of organic phosphorus from soil to bodies of water. Many organisms rely on the soil derived phosphorus for their phosphorus nutrition.

Eutrophication 

Eutrophication is an enrichment of water by nutrient that lead to structural changes to the aquatic ecosystem such as algae bloom, deoxygenation, reduction of fish species. The primary source that contributes to the eutrophication is considered as nitrogen and phosphorus. When these two elements exceed the capacity of the water body, eutrophication occurs. Phosphorus that enters lakes will accumulate in the sediments and the biosphere, it also can be recycled from the sediments and the water system. Drainage water from agricultural land also carries phosphorus and nitrogen. Since a large amount of phosphorus is in the soil contents, so the overuse of fertilizers and over-enrichment with nutrients will lead to increasing the amount of phosphorus concentration in agricultural runoff. When eroded soil enters the lake, both phosphorus and the nitrogen in the soil contribute to eutrophication, and erosion caused by deforestation which also results from uncontrolled planning and urbanization.

Wetland 
Wetlands are frequently applied to solve the issue of eutrophication. Nitrate is transformed in wetlands to free nitrogen and discharged to the air.  Phosphorus is adsorbed by wetland soils which are taken up by the plants. Therefore, wetlands could help to reduce the concentration of nitrogen and phosphorus to remit and solve the eutrophication. However, wetland soils can only hold a limited amount of phosphorus. To remove phosphorus continually, it is necessary to add more new soils within the wetland from remnant plant stems, leaves, root debris, and undecomposable parts of dead algae, bacteria, fungi, and invertebrates.

Human influences

Nutrients are important to the growth and survival of living organisms, and hence, are essential for development and maintenance of healthy ecosystems. Humans have greatly influenced the phosphorus cycle by mining phosphorus, converting it to fertilizer, and by shipping fertilizer and products around the globe. Transporting phosphorus in food from farms to cities has made a major change in the global Phosphorus cycle. However, excessive amounts of nutrients, particularly phosphorus and nitrogen, are detrimental to aquatic ecosystems. Waters are enriched in phosphorus from farms' run-off, and from effluent that is inadequately treated before it is discharged to waters. The input of P in agricultural runoff can accelerate the eutrophication of P-sensitive surface waters. Natural eutrophication is a process by which lakes gradually age and become more productive and may take thousands of years to progress. Cultural or anthropogenic eutrophication, however, is water pollution caused by excessive plant nutrients; this results in excessive growth in the algal population; when this algae dies its putrefaction depletes the water of oxygen.  Such eutrophication may also give rise to toxic algal bloom.  Both these effects cause animal and plant death rates to increase as the plants take in poisonous water while the animals drink the poisoned water. Surface and subsurface runoff and erosion from high-phosphorus soils may be major contributing factors to this fresh water eutrophication. The processes controlling soil Phosphorus release to surface runoff and to subsurface flow are a complex interaction between the type of phosphorus input, soil type and management, and transport processes depending on hydrological conditions.

Repeated application of liquid hog manure in excess to crop needs can have detrimental effects on soil phosphorus status. Also, application of biosolids may increase available phosphorus in soil. In poorly drained soils or in areas where snowmelt can cause periodic waterlogging, reducing conditions can be attained in 7–10 days. This causes a sharp increase in phosphorus concentration in solution and phosphorus can be leached. In addition, reduction of the soil causes a shift in phosphorus from resilient to more labile forms. This could eventually increase the potential for phosphorus loss. This is of particular concern for the environmentally sound management of such areas, where disposal of agricultural wastes has already become a problem. It is suggested that the water regime of soils that are to be used for organic wastes disposal is taken into account in the preparation of waste management regulations.

Human interference in the phosphorus cycle occurs by overuse or careless use of phosphorus fertilizers. This results in increased amounts of phosphorus as pollutants in bodies of water resulting in eutrophication. Eutrophication devastates water ecosystems by inducing anoxic conditions.

See also 
 Peak phosphorus
 Planetary boundaries
Phosphite anion
Phosphate
Phosphine
Oceanic carbon cycle

References

External links 
 
 
 
 
 

Biogeochemical cycle
Soil biology
Soil chemistry
Phosphorus